The Railway Museum of Grängesberg (GBBJ), also called the Museum of Locomotives is a Swedish museum of locomotives, located 2 km southwest of the center of Grängesberg, Dalarna, in direction towards Örebro, Västmanland.

History

The museum was established in 1979, located in a locomotive stable erected in 1928.

The museum preserves the world's only remaining steam turbine locomotive in function, Ljungström locomotive M3t nr 71, manufactured in 1930 by Nydqvist & Holm AB and renovated by the Locomotive Museum for the 125th anniversary of the Swedish Railways in June 1981. This locomotive was built in 3 units, and all of them are preserved at the museum. With a power of 22 tons, it is still Sweden's most powerful steam locomotive. Practical tests showed that it was able to transport 2,000 tons in 17 per mille elevation.

Gallery

See also
 Swedish Railway Museum

References

External links

 Official website

Dalarna County
Railway museums in Sweden